Dial "S" for Sonny is the debut studio album by jazz pianist Sonny Clark recorded in 1957 for the Blue Note label and performed by Clark with Art Farmer, Curtis Fuller, Hank Mobley, Wilbur Ware, and Louis Hayes. The album title is an allusion to Frederick Knott's play Dial M for Murder, which was first produced in 1952 and then made into a successful film by Alfred Hitchcock in 1954.

Reception
Critic John S. Wilson, in a contemporaneous review, remarked negatively that "Art Farmer contributes some crackling solos to Dial S for Sonny, [...] but he has to fight a chomp-chomp rhythm section". An AllMusic review by Stephen Thomas Erlewine stated: "Dial "S" for Sonny, Sonny Clark's first session for Blue Note Records and his first session as a leader, is a terrific set of laidback bop, highlighted by Clark's liquid, swinging solos... Clark steals the show in this set of fine, straight-ahead bop."

Track listing
All compositions by Sonny Clark, except as indicated

 "Dial "S" for Sonny" – 7:26
 "Bootin' It" – 5:17
 "It Could Happen to You" (Johnny Burke, Jimmy Van Heusen) – 6:59
 "Sonny's Mood" – 8:38
 "Shoutin' on a Riff" – 6:45
 "Love Walked In" (George Gershwin, Ira Gershwin) – 5:50
 "Bootin' It" [Alternate Take] – 5:15 Bonus track on CD

Personnel
Sonny Clark – piano
Art Farmer – trumpet (tracks 1–5 and 7)
Curtis Fuller – trombone (tracks 1–5 and 7)
Hank Mobley – tenor saxophone (tracks 1–5 and 7)
Wilbur Ware – bass
Louis Hayes – drums

Production
 Alfred Lion – producer
 Reid Miles – design
 Rudy Van Gelder – engineer
 Francis Wolff – photography

Charts

References

Sonny Clark albums
1957 albums
Blue Note Records albums
Albums produced by Alfred Lion
Albums recorded at Van Gelder Studio